Mugilogobius stigmaticus, commonly known as blackspot mangrove goby, is a species of goby native to the waters of eastern Australia.

References 

blackspot mangrove goby
Marine fish of Eastern Australia
Taxa named by Charles Walter De Vis
blackspot mangrove goby